The Tour of Extremadura (Spanish: Vuelta Ciclista Internacional  Extremadura  or Vuelta a Extremadura) was an annual multiple stage bicycle race in Spain, visiting the main towns of the Extremadura region. Beginning as an amateur event in 1987, it became part of the professional UCI Europe Tour in 2005, and was last run in 2011.

History
The first race took place in 1987, although it did not become a regular event until 2002. It was restricted to amateurs until the creation of the Continental Circuits UCI in 2005, when it became part of the professional circuit of the UCI Europe Tour, in category 2.2 (the lowest professional category). The 2010 event was cancelled, and the final race took place in 2011 as an amateur event, with all its stages in the province of Badajoz, and four of the five stages started and finished in the same place.

Notable winners include José Ángel Gómez Marchante and Daniel Lloyd, both professional cyclists.

Results

List of winners by country

References

External links
 Official website
 Vuelta a Extremadura (sitiodeciclismo.net)
 Vuelta a Extremadura (cqranking.com)

Defunct cycling races in Spain
Sport in Extremadura
Recurring sporting events disestablished in 2011
2011 disestablishments in Spain
Recurring sporting events established in 1987
1987 establishments in Spain